Liam Ó Rinn (20 November 1886 – 3 October 1943; born William J. Ring, also known by the pen name ) was a civil servant and Irish-language writer and translator, best known for "Amhrán na bhFiann", a translation of "The Soldier's Song", the Irish national anthem, which has largely eclipsed Peadar Kearney's English-language original.

Life and career
Ó Rinn was born in Ballybough, Dublin, one of five sons and one daughter of Patrick Ring, a Dublin Metropolitan Police officer from Kilkenny, and his wife Elizabeth (née Griffith) from Laytown, County Meath. He attended St. Joseph's C.B.S. in Fairview, leaving aged 14 to work as a solicitor's clerk. He studied Irish with the Gaelic League, where he worked from c.1907 to 1920. He took part in the Easter Rising and was interned at Frongoch until December 1916. He was interned for a year in the Irish War of Independence. He wrote articles in Irish from 1914 and published books from 1920. He translated news stories in the Freeman's Journal in 1922–24, when he went to work in the Free State Oireachtas' translation department, producing Irish versions of official documents, including the 1922 constitution and the current 1937 constitution. He learned French, German, Spanish, Welsh, and Russian, and translated works from several Continental authors. He married Ellen Fennelly in 1920; they had several children.

Piaras Béaslaí said of Ó Rinn:

Art Ó Maolfhábhail noted his influence in writing about the modern urban world, including coining many new terms.

Amhrán na bhFiann

Although Ruth Sherry says Ó Rinn's translation of "The Soldiers' Song" was first published in An tÓglach (the magazine of the Irish Defence Forces) on 3 November 1923, an almost identical text was printed in the Freeman's Journal on 3 April 1923, under Ó Rinn's pen name "Coinneach". Other translations had already been made into literary Classical Irish, whereas Ó Rinn favoured the living vernacular spoken in Gaeltacht areas. The Gaelic Athletic Association adopted Ó Rinn's version in the 1930s to be sung before all its matches, and it gradually eclipsed the English-language version in general use. Although the Irish version was never formally adopted by the state, both the English and Irish texts appear in Facts about Ireland, published by the Department of Foreign Affairs, and on the official website of the Department of the Taoiseach.

Works
Translations into Irish
 The Books of the Polish People and of the Polish Pilgrimage by Adam Mickiewicz
 Prose poems by Ivan Turgenev 
 Rise of the Irish Volunteers by Maurice George Moore
 Stars in Their Courses by James Hopwood Jeans   
 Intensive Culture of Crops by Henri de Courcy
 Hygiene by Richard Hayes
 Our Country's Story by A. B. Ochiltree Ferguson
 The Law-Suit by Roderich Benedix
 "The Soldier's Song" by Peadar Kearney

Original works
 "Cad ba dhóbair dó" agus sgeulta eile
 Turus go Páras
 Peann agus Pár
 Mo chara Stiofán
 
 

Other
 Slighe na Saoirse (Irish Volunteers drill guide)
 So súd (anthology)

Sources

References
General

WorldCat

Translators to Irish
Translators from Polish
Russian–Irish translators
Irish translators
20th-century Irish male writers
Civil servants from Dublin (city)
People of the Easter Rising
Writers from Dublin (city)
Irish-language writers
20th-century Irish translators
People educated at St. Joseph's CBS, Fairview

1886 births
1943 deaths